Opplysningsrådet for Veitrafikken (OFV, 'Norwegian Road Federation') is a Norwegian interest group.

It was established in 1948, and its purpose is to spread information and to "influence opinion" for the benefit of road transportation. It is a member of the International Road Federation.

References

External links
Official site
 Nøkkelopplysninger fra Enhetsregisteret OPPLYSNINGSRÅDET FOR VEITRAFIKKEN at Brønnøysund Register Centre

Transport organisations based in Norway
Organizations established in 1948
Organisations based in Oslo
1948 establishments in Norway